Martha Adelaide Holton (18601947) was a children's fiction author of the late 19th century and early 20th century. She was Supervisor of Primary Education in the Minneapolis Public Schools for 10 years. She wrote the Holton Primer (1901). She cowrote Industrial Work for Public Schools (1904) with Alice F. Rollins, which describes a variety of construction projects in different mediums: cardboard, paper, clay, weaving, whittling, sewing and iron work. She worked with Charles Madison Curry to create the Holton-Curry Reader, a basal reader in 8 volumes for the elementary grades, which was published by Rand McNally in 1914.

Books 
 Holton Primer (1901)
 Industrial Work for Public Schools (1904; with Alice F. Rollins)

References

External links 
 Online Books by M. Adelaide Holton

19th-century American non-fiction writers
20th-century American non-fiction writers
Year of birth missing
Year of death missing